Patricia "Patty" Spivot is a fictional character who appears in various DC Comics publications and was created by writer Cary Bates and artist Irv Novick. She is a friend and partner of the second Flash, Barry Allen. She first appeared in "Five-Star Super-Hero Spectacular" (DC Special Series #1, September 1977).

Spivot appeared as a recurring cast member on The CW television series second season of The Flash played by Shantel VanSanten. This version is a detective of the Central City Police Department.

Fictional character biography

Patricia 'Patty' Spivot was the part-time lab assistant to police scientist Barry Allen in the Central City Police Department. She later became the police department's full-time forensic-blood analyst.

After David Singh took over the crime lab as director and began to emphasize the quantity of the cases solved over the quality, Patty decided to leave Central City for Blue Valley, Nebraska.

Barry attempted to contact Patty to get help on the case of Elongated Kid's death. She was visiting her mother in Keystone City at the time, so she went to the police lab to meet Barry. She told him that she was enjoying her new life in Blue Valley. Wanting to put the past behind her, she asked not to get involved. Barry received a call to another crime scene, and he convinced her to join him. Here, they found a young boy hiding in a shipping container. They brought the boy to the police station to interview as a witness, but he refused to open up to anyone but Patty. Shortly thereafter, the boy revealed himself to her as Eobard Thawne, the Reverse-Flash. It was he who had been responsible for the deaths of Elongated Kid and others, and he threatened to kill Patty in the same way, by accelerating her aging process until she died of old age within seconds. However, Flash, Kid Flash, and Hot Pursuit arrived on the scene just in time, saving Patty.

Later, Barry went to the police station to see if Patty was okay. Patty revealed to Barry that she planned to return to Blue Valley, but Barry tried to convince her to stay. Then, Patty revealed to Barry her unrequited crush on him. Surprised by this, Barry tells her that he will always be her friend and asks her to think about staying in Central City, and Patty promises she will. But in that moment, Iris comes in, and Patty, trying to avoid an awkward moment, leaves.

Flashpoint

Patty, wanting to do something bigger with her life, stole the former Hot Pursuit's gear from the Central City Police Department evidence locker, which was set to be transported to the Justice League, becoming the new Hot Pursuit.
Escaping from a group of cops in her Cosmic Motorcycle, Patty went to a rooftop. Suddenly, her bike detected a timestorm and initiated an emergency chronal-evac, transporting her to the year 3011.

There, she was captured by Brainiac's forces and placed in a hibernation chamber, where she was forced to relive her worst memory: drowning to death for a few minutes in a pool when she was a kid. However, she managed to escape.

Later, she helps Kid Flash (Bart Allen) escape from Brainiac, Earth's ruler in 3011. After they get to safety, Patty reveals her identity to him and explains that they are in the 31st century. Kid Flash tells her that he was born in the 31st century and it is nothing like the 31st century he was born in, so something must have changed in the timeline. Patty tells him that her bike can travel through time but only if it has the Speed Force tank, so Kid Flash agrees to find it. Kid Flash tells her that they must get back to the past and fix the timeline. Then, Kid Flash takes off his glove and shows that his right hand has lost its skin and it only has muscles and bone.

Patty reveals to Kid Flash how she became Hot Pursuit. Bart takes Patty's helmet and uses it to see how much was the timeline changed. Suddenly, the two are attacked by Brainiac's probes, but they escape using the Cosmic Motorcycle. Hiding in an abandoned building, they decide to enter Brainiac's fortress to obtain the Speed Force tank.

Bart lets himself be captured by Brainiac, who places him in a virtual reality chamber. Inside the chamber Bart manages to rewrite several of Brainiac's programs, including his security systems. This allows Patty to enter the citadel and rescue Kid Flash. They manage to find the Speed Force tank, but Brainiac impales Patty in the chest with his claws. Enraged, Bart attacks him while Patty obtains the tank. Using her last moments, Patty smashes the tank in front of Bart, allowing him to regain his speed. Patty dies and her body is taken by Brainiac. Bart escapes to the past, promising to save her.

The New 52

Flash managed to change reality and create a new universe, bringing Patty back to life. In this new reality, Barry never marries with Iris West and enters a relationship with Patty. After the Future Flash incident, she breaks up with Barry and is never seen in the comics since.

In other media

Patty Spivot appears in season two of The Flash, portrayed by Shantel VanSanten. This version is a uniformed police officer who intended to become a CSI, but joined the police force to seek revenge on Mark Mardon for murdering her father when she was a teenager. Over the course of the season, she helps Barry Allen / Flash and the Central City Police Department (CCPD) capture metahumans and enters a relationship with him, though she disagrees with his overprotective tendencies in the face of various enemies. After discovering Barry's secret identity, she breaks up with him, resolves to remain friends with him, and transfers to Midway City to become a CSI.

References

External links
 Arrowverse entry for Patty Spivot
 Character Comic Vine profile

Characters created by Cary Bates
Characters created by Irv Novick
Comics characters introduced in 1977
DC Comics female characters
Fictional forensic scientists
Fictional female scientists
Central City Police Department officers
Flash (comics) characters